Daman Singh is an Indian writer and daughter of Former Prime Minister of India, Manmohan Singh.

Personal life 
She is married to Ashok Patnaik (IPS Officer of 1983 batch) who was the CEO of the National Intelligence Grid (NATGRID) of India.

Books
 The Last Frontier: People And Forests In Mizoram (1996) 
 The Sacred Grove (2012) 
 Nine by Nine (2013) 
 Strictly Personal: Manmohan and Gursharan (2014)

References

Living people
Punjabi people
Children of prime ministers of India
21st-century Indian biographers
Indian women non-fiction writers
Women biographers
Indian women novelists
21st-century Indian women writers
21st-century Indian novelists
Indian Sikhs
Women writers from Punjab, India
Novelists from Punjab, India
Year of birth missing (living people)

Manmohan Singh